Streptomyces monomycini is a bacterium species from the genus of Streptomyces.

See also 
 List of Streptomyces species

References

Further reading

External links
Type strain of Streptomyces monomycini at BacDive -  the Bacterial Diversity Metadatabase	

monomycini
Bacteria described in 1986